Changsha stinky tofu or stinky dry food, known in Chinese as Changsha chou doufu, also translated as Changsha-style stinky tofu, is a traditional snack in Changsha, Hunan, which belongs to Hunan cuisine. It is one of the renowned stinky tofu in Southern China.

Changsha stinky tofu, along with Yongfeng chili sauce and Xiangtan lotus seeds, are referred to as the "Three Treasures of Hunan". It is the most applauded one among the different types of stinky tofu throughout China. 

Changsha stinky tofu is famed for its spicy flavor, and unlike Sichuan stinky tofu, it has black crackling. The local people in Changsha call it chou ganzi (smelly jerky).

References

Hunan cuisine
Snack foods
Chinese cuisine